The , or IUC, is a Japanese language school located in the Minato Mirai area of Yokohama, Japan.  Operated by a consortium of universities, the IUC provides advanced-level instruction to both undergraduate and graduate students and is considered one of the most selective and rigorous Japanese language programs in the world.

History 

The IUC was established in 1961 in Tokyo, Japan by Stanford University.  Administration of the Center first moved to a consortium model in 1963; currently, 15 schools participate in the operations of the Center.  The Center eventually moved to Yokohama, where it set up in the Pacifico Yokohama complex in the Minato Mirai port area.

Program 

The IUC offers one 10-month program during the academic year and another shorter program during the summer months.  The programs are focused on advanced Japanese suitable for professional or academic use, and prospective students must have completed at least two years of college-level training and pass a language exam to be eligible for enrollment.  Although often supplemented by a scholarship, the tuition for the 10-month program is $33,000, with a partial remission for students who are current students or recent alumni of a consortium school.

The IUC is considered one of the top Japanese schools in the world.  Former U.S. ambassador to Japan and vice-president Walter Mondale called it "imperative for the sake of America's future relations with [Japan]", and former ambassador and Speaker of the House Thomas Foley noted that its graduates play a "central part" in the U.S.-Japan relationship.

Publications 

As a language school, the IUC continues to perform research into the Japanese language and has published a number of books and materials on the subject through the Japan Times Press.

Consortium Members 

 Brigham Young University
 Columbia University
 Harvard University
 Princeton University
 Stanford University
 University of British Columbia
 University of California, Berkeley
 University of California, Los Angeles
 University of Chicago
 University of Hawaiʻi at Mānoa
 University of Michigan
 University of Washington
 Yale University

In Association With:
 University of Illinois at Urbana-Champaign
 Washington University in St. Louis

References

External links
 The Inter-University Center for Japanese Language Studies
 The Stanford University page on the IUC
 The IUC at Cornell University
 Review of IUC textbook (JSTOR)
 The IUC on the International Resource Information System

Academic language institutions
Japanese studies